Paganello is a beach ultimate event held over the Easter weekend in Rimini, Italy.

The sport competitions which take place during Paganello are the World Beach Ultimate Cup and the Acrobatic Freestyle Paganello.
It was in Rimini, at Paganello that Beach Ultimate, the beach version of Ultimate, was invented.
Held for the first time in 1991, Paganello has become one of the world's biggest Ultimate events and one of the most popular tournaments internationally.
Many of the best European teams as well as many competitive American teams  attend Paganello. More than 1,200 athletes from 25 countries attend and play a total of almost 500 games.
The tournament takes place over the course of four days, ending on Monday afternoon with the finals of the four divisions: juniors, mixed, women's and men's, played in front of about 10,000 spectators.

External links
 http://www.paganello.com

Flying disc tournaments
Ultimate (sport) competitions